Manmohan Desai (26 February 1937 – 1 March 1994) was an Indian film producer and director. He was one of the most successful filmmaker of the 70s and 80s. Desai is now considered one of the most influential film director of Bollywood and a pioneer of making masala film.

Family background 
Manmohan Desai was of Gujarati ancestry. His father, Kikubhai Desai, was an Indian film producer and owner of Paramount Studios (later Filmalaya) from 1931 to 1941. His productions, mainly stunt films, included Circus Queen, Golden Gang, and Sheikh Challi. Manmohan Desai's elder brother, Subhash Desai, became a producer in the 1950s and gave Manmohan his first break in the Hindi film Chhalia (1960). Subhash later went on to produce Bluff Master, Dharam Veer, and Desh Premee with Manmohan as the director.

His wife was Jeevanprabha Desai. She died in April 1979. He was engaged to actress Nanda from 1992 until the time of his death in 1994. He had one son Ketan Desai who is still involved in the film industry. Ketan is married to Kanchan Kapoor, daughter of Shammi Kapoor and Geeta Bali.

On 1 March 1994, as per news Manmohan Desai fell from the balcony in Girgaon as the rail he was leaning on collapsed and died. Very little is known about his death except that he was suffering from chronic back pain. Rumours of him committing suicide have not been confirmed.

Career 
Manmohan Desai was known for his family-centered, action-song-and-dance films which catered to the tastes of the Indian masses and through which he achieved great success. His movies defined a new genre called masala films. A common theme in his films were the lost and found plot where family members would be separated and reunited.

Filmography

References

External links 

1937 births
1994 deaths
Film producers from Mumbai
20th-century Indian film directors
Hindi-language film directors
Gujarati people
Film directors from Mumbai